Josef Prager (15 November 1886 – 1975) was an Austrian footballer. He played in six matches for the Austria national football team from 1904 to 1910.

References

External links
 

1886 births
1975 deaths
Austrian footballers
Austria international footballers
Place of birth missing
Association footballers not categorized by position